Incredible! Kaleidoscope is Kaleidoscope's third album. The line-up had changed, with original bassist Chris Darrow and drummer John Vidican replaced by Stuart Brotman and Paul Lagos. It was the only Kaleidoscope album to chart, reaching number 139 on Billboard, and it's still remembered fondly by members of the band, especially David Lindley.

Track listing

Personnel
David Lindley – guitar, banjo, fiddle, mandolin
Stuart Brotman – bass, vocals
Solomon Feldthouse – vocals, saz, bouzouki, oud, dulcimer, guitar, jumbus
Chester Crill (as Templeton Parcely) – violin, organ, vocals; also (appearing as "special guest Max Buda") harmonica
Paul Lagos – drums, percussion, vocals

References

1969 albums
Kaleidoscope (American band) albums
Epic Records albums